This is a list of monuments that are classified by the Moroccan ministry of culture around Azilal.

Monuments and sites in Azilal

|}

References 

Azilal
Azilal Province